The sack of Berwick was the first significant battle of the First War of Scottish Independence in 1296.

Background
Upon the death of Margaret, Maid of Norway, in late September 1290, there arose a number of claimants to the throne of Scotland. The Guardians of Scotland were the de facto heads of state until a king was chosen. The late king, Alexander III, had been married to Margaret of England, sister to Edward I, and he was asked to conduct the court proceedings in the dispute, though not to arbitrate; the decision was to be made by a jury of 104 "auditors".

John Balliol, a descendant of King David I, was chosen and was inaugurated at Scone, on St. Andrew's Day, 30 November 1292. Edward I treated Scotland as a feudal vassal state, claiming contributions toward the cost of the defence of England. When he demanded military support for his war against France, the Scots responded by forming an alliance with the French, and launched an unsuccessful attack on Carlisle.

Battle
After the raid on Carlisle was committed by the seven invading Scottish earls (Buchan, Menteith, Strathearn, Lennox, Ross, Athol and Mar), the English, under Edward I, began the initial conquest of Scotland in the first phase of the war. On 28 March (the Wednesday in Easter Week), Edward passed the river Tweed with his troops and stayed that night in Scotland at the priory of Coldstream. From there he marched on the town of Berwick.

Berwick, a royal burgh just north of the border, was Scotland's most important trading port, second only to London in economic importance in medieval Britain at that point. Berwick is referenced to be called "Alexandria of the North". Estimates also show that Berwick was, if not the most, one of the most populated towns in Scotland. Its garrison was commanded by William the Hardy, Lord of Douglas, while the besieging party was led by Robert de Clifford, 1st Baron de Clifford. Contemporary accounts of the number slain range from 4,000 to 17,000. Women by some sources were spared. The English took the castle, whereupon Douglas surrendered and his life and those of his garrison were spared.

The Battle of Dunbar crushed further Scottish resistance.

References

Battles of the Wars of Scottish Independence
History of the Scottish Borders
Conflicts in 1296
1296 in Europe
13th-century massacres
Sack
Massacres in Scotland
Massacres committed by England
1296 in Scotland
1290s in England
13th-century military history of Scotland